Lisa Brown (born January 17, 1971 in Port of Spain, Trinidad and Tobago) is a Trinidadian boxer. During her career, from which she retired, she held the WIBA, WBA, IFBA, and WIBC super bantamweight titles, and the IWBF bantamweight title.

Early life
Lisa Brown was born 17 January 1971, in the city of Port of Spain in Trinidad and Tobago. Brown was born into a family of four as the only girl. Brown was interested in cricket in Trinidad. When she emigrated to Canada at the age of 17 she searched for a similar sport, but cricket wasn't as recognized in Canada.

She married professional boxer Errol Brown who discovered her talent and encouraged her to get into boxing. He also became her trainer. At first she was hesitant, but after she saw Christy Martin fight Deirdre Gogarty in 1996 it inspired her to start boxing.

Amateur career
Brown began boxing as an amateur in 1997 when she was 26 years old. As an amateur she fought 32 fights, she won 26 of them, and won her first amateur fight by a knockout. During this period she also fought some of the Canadian national team members.

She also took part in the Canadian National Championships in 1998 and 1999. On January 17, 1998, she fought in the finals against Patricia Picotin in Edmonton, she won a silver medal. On January 24, 1999, she won the Canadian National Championships by a walkover.
She also fought in the Canadian national team for a couple of years. On March 24, 1999, she fought Frida Emanuelsson in the Canada-Sweden Dual.

She finished her amateur career with a 26-6 record before turning professional.

Professional career
Brown made her pro boxing debut against Leilani Salazar at the Convention Center in Tucson on May 5, 2000. Beating her opponent with a TKO in the fourth round. She started her career with eight wins in a row. She would beat her opponents in their home town, which earned her the nickname, "Bad News".

On September 1, 2001, Lisa Brown faced Leona Brown for the second time in a row that year. The fight was held at Cedarbridge Academy in Bermuda. In her first fight Lisa beat Leona by a six round unanimous decision in the Civic Center earlier that year. And when she beat Leona for the second time, she won the vacant IWBF bantamweight title.

On September 23, 2005, Lisa Brown fought Jackie Chavez at the Jean Pierre Sports Complex in Port of Spain, Brown won the WIBC and WIBA junior featherweight titles with a ten round unanimous decision over Jackie Chavez.

On March 22, 2007, at the Isleta Casino & Resort in Albuquerque, Lisa Brown faced Jackie Chavez again for the IFBA junior featherweight title, Brown was again the victor, winning by unanimous decision over ten rounds.

On March 7, 2009, at the Jean Pierre Sports Complex in Port of Spain, Brown won the WIBA junior featherweight title. She TKO'd her opponent Maribel Santana in the third round at the 1:45 mark.

On March 27, 2010, at the Casino Rama in Ramara, Brown fought Ana Julaton for the vacant WBA super bantamweight title and won the fight with a unanimous decision.

On November 19, 2011, Brown fought again for the WIBA junior featherweight title. She fought against Angela Marciales at the Queen's Park Oval in Port of Spain. She won the fight by a TKO in the fourth round at the 1:26 mark.

In her last fight on September 21, 2013, she beat Amanda Beaudin with a split decision and hasn't fought since.

Professional boxing record

References

External links
 

1971 births
Living people
World boxing champions
Trinidad and Tobago women boxers
Sportspeople from Port of Spain
Bantamweight boxers